The Hollywood Music in Media Award for Best Original Song in a Video Game is one of the awards given annually to people working in the entertainment industry by the Hollywood Music in Media Awards (HMMA). It is presented to the songwriters who have composed the best "original" song, written specifically for video game. The award was first given in 2014, during the fifth annual awards.

Winners and nominees

2010s

2020s

See also
Academy Award for Best Original Song

References

Best Original Song in a Documentary
Film awards for Best Song
Awards established in 2014